Roberto Vigoreaux Lorenzana (born January 12, 1956, in San Juan, Puerto Rico) is a Puerto Rican producer, TV show host, actor, singer, and former Senator. He is the son of TV producer Luis Vigoreaux, and the younger brother of Luisito Vigoreaux.

Early years and studies

Roberto Vigoreaux was born on January 12, 1956, to producer Luis Vigoreaux and Rosaura Lorenzana. He is the youngest of two sons, the other being Luisito Vigoreaux.

Vigoreaux studied at the University of Puerto Rico, and then at Loyola University New Orleans.

Career in the media

In 1970, Vigoreaux starred as Chago in the Walt Disney Production Cristobalito, the Calypso Colt, when he was still a young teenager. After growing up, he worked as a radio broadcaster in several stations, as well as acting in plays. Throughout his career, he has worked for stations like Radio Rock, WAPA Radio, Radio Aeropuerto and Radio Luz.

In 1984, Vigoreaux hosted the show Son del Caribe. Some time later, he moved to WAPA-TV where he starred hosting a game show called Parejo, doble, y triple with his brother, Luisito. He also hosted the show Sábado en Grande. After performing a duet on his show Sábado en Grande, with singer Lourdes Robles, Vigoreaux decided to start a musical career. In 1988, he released his first and only album titled Amores de mi vida. The album received a lukewarm response.

In 1986, both Roberto and his brother Luisito appeared in a Burger King commercial for the Puerto Rican market, where they acted and sang.

Vigoreaux has also worked as a host of several beauty pageants. He also had roles in comedies and shows like Generaciones, and musicals like Clemente, where he played the role of his father, Luis Vigoreaux. In the late 1980s he played the role of Joe Hardy in a revival of the Broadway musical Damn Yankees, with Marian Pabón.

Career as entrepreneur

Vigoreaux opened a series of ice cream franchises called Scoops, with stores in San Juan, Cayey, and Bayamón.

Career in politics: 1996–2004

Representative: 1996–2000

In 1993, Vigoreaux retired from show business and began to pursue a career as a politician. In 1996, he was elected as a member of the Puerto Rico House of Representatives for the Popular Democratic Party (PPD).

Senator: 2000–2004

Vigoreaux was elected in 2000 as a senator.

Candidate for Mayor of San Juan: 2003

Vigoreaux announced his interest in running for mayor of the city of San Juan during the elections of 2004. However, he lost in the 2003 primaries against Eduardo Bhatia. After that, he has continued to work as an adviser to the Senate of Puerto Rico.

Return to politics: 2011–present

In September 2011, Vigoreaux announced his candidacy to the House of Representatives for the 2012 general elections. However, he lost at the PPD primaries held on March 18.

Personal life

Vigoreaux has been married to Mary Ann Cortés since 1987. They have three children.

In 1983, when Roberto was in his 20s, his father Luis Vigoreaux, was brutally murdered. The investigation revealed that Vigoreaux's second wife, Lydia Echevarria, was complicit in his murder, after allegedly she paid two men to beat Vigoreaux.

See also

List of Puerto Ricans
French immigration to Puerto Rico

References

External links
Fundacion Nacional Cultura biography 

1956 births
Living people
Popular Democratic Party members of the House of Representatives of Puerto Rico
Members of the Senate of Puerto Rico
Puerto Rican people of French descent
Puerto Rican Roman Catholics
Puerto Rican television hosts